The 2021–22 Vermont Catamounts men's basketball team represented the University of Vermont in the 2021–22 NCAA Division I men's basketball season. They played their home games at the Patrick Gym in Burlington, Vermont and are led by eleventh-year head coach John Becker. They finished the season 28–6, 17–1 in America East play to finish as regular season champions. They defeated NJIT, Binghamton, and UMBC to with the America East tournament. As a result, they received the conference’s automatic bid to the NCAA tournament as the No. 13 seed in the West Region where they lost in the first round to Arkansas. 

This was to be the team's last season at Patrick Gym, but their new arena, Tarrant Event Center, was put on indefinite hold, due to a combination of the COVID-19 pandemic and rising borrowing costs.

Previous season
In a season limited due to the ongoing COVID-19 pandemic, the Catamounts finished the 2020–21 season 10–5, 10–4 in America East play to tie the regular season conference championship with UMBC. They lost to Hartford in the first round of the America East tournament.

Roster

Schedule and results

|-
!colspan=12 style=| Exhibition 

|-
!colspan=12 style=| Non-conference regular season

|-
!colspan=9 style=| America East regular season

|-
!colspan=12 style=| America East tournament

|-
!colspan=12 style=| NCAA tournament

|-

Source

References

Vermont Catamounts men's basketball seasons
Vermont Catamounts
Vermont Catamounts men's basketball
Vermont Catamounts men's basketball
Vermont